Wayne Hovey (born 13 July 1956) is a former Australian rules footballer who played for Geelong in the Victorian Football League (now known as the Australian Football League).

He is the son of Jim Hovey, who played for Geelong in the 1940s. His uncles, Ced and Ron, were also Geelong footballers.

References 

1956 births
Living people
Geelong Football Club players
Shepparton United Football Club players
Australian rules footballers from Victoria (Australia)